Calocoris angustatus, the 'sorghum head bug, is a species of true bug in the family Miridae. It is a pest of sorghum in India, and has also been reported from Kenya and Rwanda.

References

Mirini
Insect pests of millets